The Loto-Tonga Soka Centre is a football facility in Nukuʻalofa, Tonga. It was funded by FIFA through the world football body's Goal Programme and was opened in 2001. It hosted matches of the first round of the OFC 2018 FIFA World Cup qualifiers. The main office of the Tonga Football Association is also located within the venue. It has a capacity of 1,500 and is home to the Tonga national football team and Veitongo FC.

References

Football venues in Tonga
Rugby league stadiums in Tonga
Sports venues completed in 2001
Nukuʻalofa
2001 establishments in Tonga